Hejdegården is a city district in Linköping. Adjoining districts are Johannelund, Downtown, Tannefors, Vimanshäll and Ramshäll.

Geography of Linköping